Ribosomal protein S6 kinase alpha-2 is an enzyme that in humans is encoded by the RPS6KA2 gene.

This gene encodes a member of the RSK (ribosomal S6 kinase) family of serine and threonine kinases. This kinase contains 2 non-identical kinase catalytic domains and phosphorylates various substrates, including members of the mitogen-activated kinase (MAPK) signalling pathway. The activity of this protein has been implicated in controlling cell growth and differentiation. Alternate transcriptional splice variants, encoding different isoforms, have been characterized.

Interactions
RPS6KA2 has been shown to interact with MAPK3 and MAPK1.

References

Further reading

EC 2.7.11